Prafulla is a given name. Notable people with the name include:

Prafulla Chaki (1888–1908), Bengali revolutionary associated with the Jugantar group
Prafulla Chandra Ghosh (1891–1983), the first Chief Minister of West Bengal, India
Prafulla Chandra Roy, Bengali academician, a chemist and entrepreneur
Prafulla Chandra Sen (1897–1990), Bengali Indian politician and freedom fighter
Prafulla Dahanukar (born 1934), award-winning Indian painter
Prafulla Kumar Das, Chief Minister of Tripura state, India from 1 April to 25 July 1977
Prafulla Kumar Mahanta (born 1952), leader of the Assam Movement, a former Chief Minister of Assam
Prafulla Kumar Sen, Indian revolutionary and philosopher

See also
Acharya Prafulla Chandra College, co-educational Government sponsored degree college in West Bengal
Acharya Prafulla ChandrDJ Ray Polytechnic, technical school in the city of Kolkata, West Bengal

Dj